Krsinji Vrh is a small settlement in the Municipality of Sevnica in central Slovenia. It lies in the hills east of Mokronog in the historical region of Lower Carniola. The Municipality of Sevnica is now included in the Lower Sava Statistical Region.

References

External links
Krsinji Vrh at Geopedia

Populated places in the Municipality of Sevnica